Okhli-ye Forugah Farahnak (also Romanized as Okhlī-ye Forūgāh Farahnāḵ; also known as Okhlī-ye Forūdgāh) is a village in Daland Rural District, in the Central District of Ramian County, Golestan Province, Iran. At the 2006 census, its population was 330, in 87 families.

References 

Populated places in Ramian County